Sinošević is a village in the municipality of Šabac, Serbia. According to the 2002 census, the village had a population of 918 people.

References

External links 

Populated places in Mačva District